Kealey may refer to:

Ben Kealey, the English touring keyboardist for the rock band Kasabian
Gregory Kealey (born 1948), professor, historian, editor, provost
Mitchell Kealey (born 1984), Australian middle-distance runner
Steve Kealey (born 1947), former Major League Baseball pitcher
Terence Kealey (born 1952), British biochemist, Vice-Chancellor of the University of Buckingham
Tom Kealey, American writer

See also
Kealey Ice Rise, an ice rise, 70 km long and 30 km wide, forming a western lobe of the larger Fowler Ice Rise